Sly Withers are an Australian alternative rock band from Perth, Western Australia. The band consists of vocalists/guitarists Jono Mata and Sam Blitvich, drummer Joel Neubecker and bassist Shea Moriarty. The line-up of the band has remained unchanged since its 2013 inception, with the band members originally meeting and forming the band while still in high school. Their second studio album, Gardens, debuted and peaked at number 10 on the ARIA Chart on 21 June 2021. A single from the album, "Clarkson", placed in Triple J's Hottest 100 of 2021 at number 69.

The band's sound combines elements of rock, punk and emo, with theMusic describing the band as "an exciting blend of introspection and euphoric indie punk".

History
The band released their self-titled debut album in September 2016.

In March 2019, the band signed with Dew Process.

On 11 June 2021, the band released their second studio album, titled Gardens, which featured the singles "Cracks", "Bougainvillea" and "Clarkson". The album debuted at number 10 on the ARIA chart.

Band members
 Jono Mata – lead and backing vocals, guitar
 Sam Blitvich – lead and backing vocals, guitar
 Joel Neubecker – drums, backing vocals
 Shea Moriarty – bass, backing vocals

Discography

Studio albums

Extended plays

Singles

Awards and nominations

National Live Music Awards
The National Live Music Awards (NLMAs) are a broad recognition of Australia's diverse live industry, celebrating the success of the Australian live scene. The awards commenced in 2016.

! 
|-
! scope="row"| 2020
| Sly Withers
| WA Live Act of the Year
| 
| 
|}

West Australian Music Industry Awards
The West Australian Music Industry Awards (WAMIs) are an annual awards ceremony presented to the local contemporary music industry, held annually by Western Australian Music Industry Association Inc (WAM).
 

! 
|-
! scope="row"| 2019
| Themselves
| Best Punk / Hardcore Act 
| 
| 
|}

References

External links
 

2015 establishments in Australia
Australian indie rock groups
Australian punk rock groups
Dew Process artists
Musical groups established in 2015
Musical groups from Perth, Western Australia
Musical quartets